Roger Morton McCardell (August 29, 1932 – November 13, 1996) was an American professional baseball player.

Baseball career
McCardell was born in Gorsuch Mills in Baltimore County, Maryland, and attended Boston University.

McCardell's professional career began in 1950 and he spent 11 seasons (and played in 911 games) in minor league baseball.  His lone big-league trial occurred at the outset of the 1959 season.  McCardell was the starting catcher in his MLB debut on May 8, and went hitless in two at bats against Danny McDevitt of the Los Angeles Dodgers before being removed for a pinch hitter. He went hitless in his two subsequent MLB at bats as well.

He was traded by the Giants to the Baltimore Orioles on November 30,  in a transaction headlined by Billy O'Dell and Jackie Brandt, but never appeared in a Major League game with his hometown club.

McCardell retired from baseball after the 1962 season and died in Wilmington, Delaware, at the age of 64.

References

External links

1932 births
1996 deaths
Baseball players from Maryland
Boston University Terriers baseball players
Charleston Senators players
Evansville Braves players
Harlan Smokies players
Jacksonville Braves players
Little Rock Travelers players
Major League Baseball catchers
Miami Marlins (IL) players
People from Baltimore County, Maryland
Phoenix Giants players
Quebec Braves players
Rochester Red Wings players
San Francisco Giants players
Sioux City Soos players
Springfield Giants players